The Qassim Province, also known as the Qassim Region, is one of the 13 provinces of Saudi Arabia. Located at the heart of the country near the geographic center of the Arabian Peninsula, it has a population of 1,370,727 and an area of 58,046 km². It is known to be the "alimental basket" of the country, for its agricultural assets.

Al-Qassim has the lowest share of population living below local poverty line in Saudi Arabia. It is the seventh most populated region in the country after Jizan and the fifth most densely populated. It has more than 400 cities, towns, villages, and Bedouin settlements, ten of which are recognized as governorates. Its capital city is Buraydah, which is inhabited by approximately 60% of the region's total population. The governor of the province from 1992 to 29 January 2015 was Prince Faisal bin Bandar, succeeded by Prince Faisal bin Mishaal.

Etymology
Al Qassim also "Al Gassim" "Gassim" derived from the word "Qassimah", a reference to قصائم الغضا, meaning the region's sand dunes from which the white saxaul trees grow. The region has a large population of Calligonum comosum plants, a woody shrub known as arta.

Location
It is bordered by Riyadh Region to the south and east, by Ha'il Region to the north, and by Al Madinah Region to the west. The region is connected to almost every part of Saudi Arabia by a very complicated network of highways. The regional airport, Prince Nayef bin Abdulaziz Regional Airport, connects Al Qassim (Gassim) to the other provinces of the country.

History

Pre-Islamic Arabia

There isn't much information known about Al Qassim the province in the times of Pre-Islamic Arabia.
Unaizah was repeatedly mentioned as a desert watering hole in the poems of Imru Al Qais (the famous Arabian poet). Moreover, AlJiwa, which is about 60 km north of Unaizah, was mentioned by the heroic Absi poet Antarah bin Shaddad.

The Abbasid era

Al Qassim Province had some important foyers on the road of pilgrims and traders coming from the east (mainly Persia and Iraq) in the era of the Abbasid Empire.

The Zubeida road was a long pilgrims road that started from the city of Kufa in Iraq and ran to Mecca in Arabia. The road was constructed in the reign of Harun Al-Rashid and was named after his wife Zubaidah.
It had pilgrims foyers in many of the region's cities including Unaizah.

Tribal conflict (1600s–1907)
The Al Abu Olayan - dynasty from the Banu Tamim tribe established the emirate of Buraydah in the late 16th century by its leader, Rashid Al Duraiby. He built Buraydah and made it the province's capital. However, Unaizah was ruled by Al Sulaim dynasty from the Subay tribe. The emirate of Buraydah was later captured by Muhanna bin Salih bin Hussein Abaalkhail from the Anazzah tribe. In 1890, the Rashidi dynasty based in Ha'il annexed the province. In 1904, the Abaalkhail recaptured the province. In 1907, the province was integrated under the Kingdom of Saudi Arabia.

Economy and Trade Era "Al Aqilat (late 1850 and early 1900)" 

They represent a civilized tribes and families from Najd, specifically from Al Qassim in Saudi Arabia. Among most important families of the Aqilat are “Aba Alkhail, Al Rumaih, Al Arfaj, Al Sugair, Al Rebdi, Al Fuzan Alsabig, Al Jarbou, Al Otaishan, Al Rawaf, Al Bati, Al Musalam, Al Sharidah, Al Assaf and Al Tuwajiri” They were famous for trading primarily gold, horses especially Arabian horses, camels, clothing and food from across Arabian Peninsula. They traded in Kuwait, Iraq, Sham "now known Jordan, Syria" and others. This nickname was unique because of their distinctiveness in wearing the Aqal and their unique uniforms from the rest of the people. they were deeply known around the people of the Arabian Peninsula and the Arab world for their courage, generosity, honesty and patience over the hardships of distant travels, as they had a great impact in flourishing of economics and business around the region. They have known as they are heroes of Arabian region as they were first ambassador of His Majesty King Abdul Aziz. As the custodian of the Two Holy Mosques, King Abdullah Bin Abdulaziz, said that Al Aqilat are the best and first ambassadors to the Arabian nations in Kingdom of Saudi Arabia. Moreover, Crown Prince Sultan bin Abdul Aziz praised the men of Al Aqilat, as he said that they were the first to bring trade to the Kingdom of Saudi Arabia.

Saudi Arabia
It is the heart of the Najd region and the centre of the Salafi movement. The province is regarded as one of the key support bases of the Al Saud family, along with Al Riyadh Province, Ha'il province and Al Jawf province. This province has also contributed many notable Salafi ulema and sheikhs.

Population

Geography
Al Qassim province is divided by the Wadi Al-Rummah (Rummah Valley).
The valley crosses the entire region from the west to the northeast.
The land's height in Qassim is about 600–750 meters above sea level, and it glides from west to east in general.

Climate 

Al Qassim region has a typical desert climate, known for its cool, rainy winters and for its hot, less humid summers.

List of Governorates

Expanded list of Governorates

Agriculture

Al-Qassim region hosts more than eight million palm trees, making it one of the Middle East’s largest producers of dates, producing an annual amount of 205 thousand tons of various types of luxury dates, which gives the region a high economic value by exporting large amounts of dates nationally and internationally, especially in the GCC region. Multi cities in the region market their dates production with dates festivals that mostly start in September, although Buraydah (the capital of the province) hosts the largest festival in the world, at which a lot of people come from all over the World to buy their yearly requirement of dates.

Along with tourism, agriculture is still the cornerstone of the region's economy. Although the region has been known for its agricultural assets for a long time, it wasn't until recently that wheat production has been introduced to the local agricultural industry, making Saudi Arabia a net exporter of cereal. The region also produces dates, grapes, lemons, grapefruits, mandarin oranges, oranges, pomegranates, and a large group of vegetables. The region also hosts one of the biggest camel market in the world, due to its central location, surrounded by Aldahna and alnfound deserts.

Agriculture in general is considered to be a very important part of the region's natives culture, with special vegetables being linked to every city, for example eating leeks (kurrat) is associated with the people of Unaizah, while adding chili peppers to meals is associated with the people of the city of Rass.

Transportation

Air
 Prince Nayef bin Abdulaziz Regional Airport (IATA: ELQ, ICAO: OEGS), The airport is an International airport, serving destinations to GCC, Egypt and Turkey. Formerly Qassim Regional Airport and widely known in the air-travel industry as "Gassim" (from Al-Qassim Province). The airport was established in 1964 and it is owned and operated by the General Authority of Civil Aviation (GACA). The airport is in the city of Al-Mulieda, which is 30 km West of Buraidah and 40 km North West of Unaizah. According to (GACA), the number of travelers has increased from 595,170 travelers in 2011 to 1,150,000 travelers in 2014.

Rail transport
The North South Railway Line is a 2,750 kilometres (1,709 mi) railway line, built by Saudi Railway Company (SAR) in Saudi Arabia. Operation on 1,392 kilometres (865 mi) long Connecting  Al Jawf Region, Northern Borders Region, Ha'il Region, Al-Qassim Region, Riyadh Region .

Al Qassim Railway Station located at East Buraydah 10 km at King Fahad Road.

Station facilities  :
ATM, Business Lounge, Baggage trolleys, Cafes, Customer Service, Lost property,  Mosque, Prayer room, Restaurants, Seated area, Shops, Car parking, Baby change, Toilets and Wi-Fi.

Timetable : 9 July – 23 September 2017

Riyadh to Qassim (Sun, Mon, Tue, Wed, Fri)  from 10:00 To 12:26  passing Majmaah Station .
Riyadh to Qassim (Thu, Sat)  from 17:30 To 20:00 passing Majmaah Station .

Qassim to Riyadh  (Sun, Mon, Tue, Wed, Fri)  from 17:45 To 20:16 passing Majmaah Station .
Qassim to Riyadh (Thu, Sat)  from 21:00 To 23:26 passing Majmaah Station .

Airlines and destinations

Roads

 Highway 65 (Saudi Arabia) (South) connects to Riyadh, Eastern Province and GCC Countries.
 Highway 65 (Saudi Arabia) (North) connects to Ha'il, Al Jouf, Qurayyat and Jordan Borders.
 Highway 60 (Saudi Arabia) (West) connects to Medina, Yanbu, Rabigh en route to Jeddah and Makkah.
 Highway 60 (Saudi Arabia) (East) connects to Al Zulfi.

Education

Schools
The region is served by schools in every city and town for all three educational levels (primary, intermediate, and secondary), and includes various types of school (public, private, Koranic, international), with international and private schools.

The region has 263,379 Female and Male Students, 33,061 Female & Male Teachers and 2,533 Schools.

Universities
Qassim University was established in 2004 by merging two Qassim branches of Imam Mohammad Ibn Saud Islamic University and King Saud University. Since the establishment of the university, it has experienced a growth in enrollment and a significant expansion of faculty and its administrative staff. The number of male and female students registered at university during 2010-11 approached 50,000 and number of faculty members and staff reached well over 4,000, At present the university encompasses 28 colleges both for male and female students.

Technical and Vocational Training Corporation

 As part of the new TVET paradigm for Technical & Vocational Education in the Kingdom of Saudi Arabia Qassim has a number of technical colleges which are operated by International Training Providers (ITP's) and these are located in Unaizah, Ar Rass and Buraydah. Hertfordshire London Colleges operate the male and female colleges in Unaizah and they provide a foundation year where students learn to communicate and understand English and IT being taught by Native English speakers from the United Kingdom. The second and third years enables students to specialize in a wide range of technical & vocational subjects which include Automotive, Electronics, Mechatronics, Manufacturing, Business, IT and Retail leading to a diploma qualification. Students will also be allowed to continue their studies to achieve a Degree qualification whilst they are working.
 The Technical and Vocational Training Corporation has colleges located in Buraidah, Onizah, Ar Rass and Al Badayea. Colleges prepare and train students to be skilled and ready for employment in different sectors (industrial, agricultural, commercial and public services), with a focus on fields of science and technology and offers different specialization's in computer science, electronics, welding, electricity, mechanics, refrigeration and air conditioning, motor vehicles, chemistry, technical and administrative, communications, space management, plumbing, carpentry, photography, marketing, architectural construction, printing, plumbing and paint.
 Colleges of Excellence, the international subsidiary of TVTC has opened a new government sponsored college in Buraydah.  The College is a vocational college focusing in Business, Technology and Electronics as majors and career fields.

Private colleges

 Qassim Private Colleges
 Al-Ghad International Medical Sciences Colleges
 Buraydah Colleges
 Sulaiman Alrajhi Colleges
 Unaizah Colleges

Cities

 Buraydah is the official capital of the region, the largest city in the province, and more than the half of the province’s population lives in it. The palace of the province' prince is located in the city, along with other governmental centers. Buraydah hosts the most important cultural, sports, artistic and official events that occur in the province. It is the seventh largest city (by population) in the country  with a total population of 609,000 (2010 census).
 Unaizah is the region's second city, total population of 163,000 (2010 census). The city is ruled by Al Sulaim dynasty, in accordance to a written treaty between them and the Saudi royal family. The city is known for its tourist attractions and festivals.
 Ar Rass is the third city in Al Qassim Province by population, total population of 133,000 (2010 census). It is also thought to be the largest city in Al Qassim Province by area. It has an area of about 60 km²

There are also other nearby rural towns including Dulay Rasheed, Almethnab, Al-Bukairiyah, Badaya'a, Riyadh Al-Khabra, Al-Khabra, and Nabhaniya.

Healthcare

Al-Qassim has many hospitals in the region that provide medical services to citizens and visitors to the region, hospitals are under the management of the Ministry of Health, Ministry of Defense, and also includes many privately managed hospitals:
  King Fahd Specialist Hospital, Buraidah - over 500 beds
  King Saud Hospital, Onaizah - 310 beds
  Children's Hospital, Buraidah - 245 beds
  Buraidah Central Hospital, Buraidah - 215 beds
  Mental Health Hospital, Buraidah - 145 beds
  Prince Sultan Cardiac Center PSCCQ  - 50 beds
  Prince Faisal Cancer Centre PFCCQ
  Prince Faisal Bin Mishaal Fertility Center
  Ar Rass General Hospital، Ar Rass - 250 beds
  Al Badayea General Hospital, Al Badayea 130 beds
  Al Mothnab General Hospital, Al Mothnab - 130 beds
  Al Bukairiyah General Hospital, Al Bukairiyah - 130 beds
  Uyun Al jiwa General Hospital, Uyun Al jiwa - 50 beds 
  Al-Quwarah General Hospital,  Al-Quwarah - 50 beds
  Al Assiyah General Hospital, Al Assiyah 50 beds
  Riyadh Al Khabra General Hospital,  Riyadh Al Khabra - 50 beds
  Al Wafaa Hospital, Onaizah
  Dr. Sulaiman Al-Habib Hospital, Buraidah
  Qassim National Hospital, Buraidah
  Security Forces Hospital, Buraidah

Sports

King Abdullah Sport City Stadium is the major stadium in Al-Qassim Region, located in the capital city of Buraidah. The stadium capacity is 25,000 and it hosts different sport and entertainment events. It is also the home ground for Al-Raed and Al-Taawon FC.
Al-Raed is the first sport club established in Al-Qassim Region and the 12'th club in Saudi Arabia, established in 1954. Al-Raed is currently playing in the Saudi Professional League, which is the highest football competition in the country.
Al-Taawon FC is the second sport club established in Al-Qassim Region and the 14th in Saudi Arabia, established in 1956. Al-Taawon FC is first team from AL-Qassim to play in the AFC champions league, which is the highest football competition in Asia, their first appearance is in the 2017 version. They are also currently playing in the Saudi Professional League, which is the highest football competition in the country.
Many clubs from Al-Qassim have made good results in the first league, the clubs that have played in the Saudi Professional League or previously the (First League) are: Al-Raed, Al-Taoun, Al-Najmah, Al-Arabi and Al-Hazem.
The following is a list of all clubs in Al-Qassim region.

Tourism

According to the Saudi Commission for Tourism and National Heritage (SCTH), Al-Qassim has been recognized as the number one province in the Kingdom in organizing festivals and events, with an annual number of 173 events in 2014. Al-Qassim Province is rich in heritage, nature, and traditional handicrafts, and its geographical location makes it the hub of diverse cultures and various festivals. Each season in Qassim has a certain festival and a specific occasion that highlights the prominent features of that season. During summer vacation, for nearly a month, various events and festivals are organized in Qassim and its governorates and are held in the markets, museums, public parks, and other locations as per the nature of the event. Such festivals are popular with the entire community, and are attended by women, men and children. The most famous events hosted in Qassim are the Buraidah Recreational Festival, Unaizah Tourism Festival, and the Al-Mithnib Summer Festival.

In addition, date festivals are held in Qassim to highlight that the Province is distinguished for its farms and dates. Shopping at the Qassim date market is a unique experience, especially during the harvest season during August and September. Al-Qassim's desert parks become more favorable during the winter and spring seasons, attracting desert lovers as well as the locals and visitors who seek rejuvenation and enjoyment in the open spaces and natural environment. These parks host the spring festivals that are usually organized during the mid-year vacation periods. The festival feature multiple activities and events that highlight the festival's nature and location.

In Al-Qassim, a number of festivals are organized in various places during different periods to recognize the city's heritage. The most prominent festivals include Al-Khelija and Traditional Products Festival in Buraidah, Entajee Festival in Unaizah, Al-Musawkaf Traditional Festival in Unaizah, Eid Al-Khabra Festival, Reef Al-Awshaziyah Festival, and Al-Russ Heritage Festival.

The region hosts many hotels, apartments and resorts for its year around visitors, such as the Mövenpick Hotel in Buraidah, Golden Tulip in Buraidah and Unaizah, Radisson blue in Buraidah, Boudl Resort and Apartments in Buraidah and Unaizah, and the Ramada Hotel in Al-Bukairiyah. Although variety of resorts and chalets and farm are offered such as Al-Malfa Rural Resorts in Unaizah.

References

 
Provinces of Saudi Arabia
Najd